Kody Lostroh (born September 18, 1985) is an American former professional rodeo cowboy who specialized in bull riding. He was the 2009 Professional Bull Riders (PBR) world champion.

Background
Kody Lostroh was born on September 18, 1985 in Longmont, Colorado. Lostroh watched a video of Cheyenne Frontier Days so many times that his mother Dena Schlutz signed him up to ride at the Boulder County Fair in 1993, when he was seven years old. He won a Little Britches Rodeo National Bull Riding title in 2003 and the Colorado High School Rodeo Bull Riding Championship three consecutive years. Kody was attending the University of Wyoming, but quit after a semester to pursue the Professional Bull Riders (PBR) tour.

Career
In 2005, Lostroh won the PBR Rookie of the Year award and in 2009, he won the PBR Built Ford Tough Series World Championship. He qualified for the PBR World Finals 10 consecutive times (2005 to 2014). Lostroh suffered multiple injuries throughout his career. For example, Lostroh injured his riding hand in January 2014 and missed most of the first half of that season. In August 2017, he was considering retirement to spend more time with his two daughters, when he began experiencing significant health problems. He was eventually diagnosed with a tumor wrapped around his carotid artery, requiring surgery. He went back to the PBR but still had some reservations.

On March 29, 2018, Lostroh announced his retirement from bull riding.

In 2022, Lostroh became the assistant coach to head coach Cord McCoy of the Oklahoma Freedom, one of eight bull riding teams of the PBR’s Team Series, which debuted that year. In September of that year, the Oklahoma Freedom won the event at Cowboy Days in Winston-Salem, North Carolina; the hometown event of rival team, the Carolina Cowboys. The very next weekend, the Freedom won their own hometown event at Freedom Fest in Oklahoma City. They were the first team to win their hometown event. The Freedom ended up finishing in fourth place at the conclusion of the inaugural PBR Team Series season.

Personal life
He raises bucking bulls in Ault, Colorado, at the Shield of Faith Cattle Company. As of 2016, Lostroh and his wife, Candace, who is a barrel racer, live in Ault, Colorado, with their two daughters.

References

Sources

External links
Kody Lostroh
Murdochs

1985 births
People from Longmont, Colorado
Living people
Bull riders